Martin Bader (born 3 May 1985) is an Austrian ski mountaineer and member of the national selection.

Bader was born and lives in Innsbruck He started ski mountaineering in 2000. For his first time, he competed at the 2005 Vennspitzlauf.

Selected results 
 2007:
 1st, Imster ski mountaineering race
 2008:
 5th, World Championship, relay, together with Andreas Kalß, Andreas Fischbacher and Alexander Lugger
 2009:
 4th, European Championship, relay, together with Johann Wieland, Wolfgang Klocker and Alexander Fasser
 2010:
 1st, Hochkönigtrophy
 2nd, Lesachtaler ski race

External links 
 Martin Bader, skimountaineering.org
 Martin Bader , ASKIMO

References 

1985 births
Living people
Austrian male ski mountaineers
Sportspeople from Innsbruck